The Meitei Pangals, also known as the Pangals or the Meitei Muslims or the Manipuri Muslims, are a group of Muslims who speak Meitei language as their native tongue. They live mainly in Manipur. The term "Pangal" simply means "Muslim" in Meitei language. Various historical sources have different dates for when Islam first entered Manipur. However, the date all sources seem to confirm as definitive is 1606 AD. The origin of the Pangal community is equally varied.

Etymology
The word Pangal was historically used by the Meitei to denote all Muslims. It is a corruption of the word Bangal as Bengalis were and are the only Muslim-majority ethnic group in the wider region. In Assam and Cachar, they used to also be referred to as "Mei-Moglai" (Mughal Meitheis). Outside of India, they can be found in Bangladesh's Moulvibazar District (particularly southern Kamalganj) where they are referred to as "Khai Bangal".

History 
In the 17th century, Meitei Prince Sanongba requested aid from Cachari King Dimasha Prataphil to defeat his brother King Khagemba. Dimasha Prataphil was aware of Khagemba's military strength and knew that his forces alone could not win. Hence, he requested the Nawab of Taraf, Muhammad Nazir to send forces to his aid, who were then dispatched under his brother Muhammad Sani. In the war. Muhammad Sani was defeated and King Khagemba took him and his 1000 troops as POWs, Later King Khagemba allowed the Muslim soldiers to settle in the valleys of Manipur. In the meanwhile Burmese army broke a war against Kangleipak in Kabaw valley. King Khagemba asked the brave soldiers to help Meitei army to fight with Burma (Myanmar). They agreed and fought the battle alongside the Meitei army. Fortunately, Meitei army won the battle. King Khagemba was very happy with that and his highness gave the name Pangal ("Pangal"= Strength in Meitei language). Through marriage, adopting the Meitei language and various local practices, which did not violate Islam, the Muslim soldiers were eventually naturalised as the Meitei Pangals. The etymology of the name is also interesting as some say it account from a Persian source states that the name Pangal was given due to their fortitude in battle, and the Pangal means ‘strength’ in Meitei language.

The Meitei Pangals were result of two Muslim migrations in 1606 and 1724. Manipur provided shelter to Shah Shuja, the Mughal prince who fled (and was pursued) to save himself from the wrath of his brother Mughal Emperor Aurangzeb. According to Henry Rule Kathe, Muslims are the result of intermixing (melting pot) of Muslims coming in different eras from different directions – Bengal, Arakan, Cachar and Manipur itself. Silk-spinning was a trade widely practised by them.

The Meitei Pangals of Manipur devastated and were taken as slaves by the invading Burmese armies.

While some Muslims were already living in Manipur, there was a significant influx of Muslims from 1660 onwards, as refugees followed the deposing of the Mughal Shah Shuja (Shangkusum) of Hindustan, who lost a war of succession to Aurangzeb. Shuja's flight is significant in the Islamic folklore of both north east India and Bangladesh.

On 6 June 1660, Shuja fled from Dacca (Dhaka), initially intent on travelling, via Chittagong to Arakan (Rakhine). Arakan, capital of the Mrauk U Kingdom, was the destination, because Sanda Sudamma (Thudamma) had reportedly promised to provide ships to take Shuja and his entourage to Mecca for haj (pilgrimage). Shaju travelled with his wife Piari Banu Begum (a.k.a. Praveen Banu, Piara Banu, or Pai Ribanu) and her sister Sabe Banu, his sons Zainul Abidin (Zainibuddin, Bon Sultan or Sultan Bang), Buland Akhtar and Zain-ul-Din Muhammad (Zainul Abedi), and daughters Gulrukh Banu, Roshanara Begum and Amina Begum, as well as two vessels of gold and silver, jewels, treasures and other royal trappings, on the backs of half a dozen camels, while about 1,000 palanquins (carriers) transported Shuja's harem. After staying for some time at Chittagong, Shuja took a land route (still called Shuja Road) southward. Shuja prayed the Eid prayer at a place called Edgoung (meaning eidgah) in Dulahazra. The part crossed the Naf River, half a mile north of Maungdaw, which is sometimes still known as "Shuja Village". The final leg was a sea voyage to Arakan where Shuja was received by an envoy of king Sanda Sudamma and escorted to quarters provided for him.  However, after Shuja arrived in Arakan, Sudama reportedly reneged on this promise and confiscated some of Shuja's treasure. In retaliation, Zainul Abidin and another brother led a Mughal attack on Sudama and almost succeeded in setting fire to the royal palace. Two or three of Shuja's sons died in subsequent fighting and/or the Mughals' flight into the jungle. Many other Mughals were massacred.  Shuja's daughter Gulrukh reportedly committed suicide after being captured and raped by Sudama. The surviving members of Shaju's party, helped reportedly by Mughals and Pathans resident at Arakan, travelled north with Portuguese mariners, at a high cost in gold and jewels.

The Hindu kings of Tripura and Manipur were more agreeable hosts – probably because they did not like the expansionist policy of Aurangzeb – and played a crucial role in concealing Shuja's whereabouts. Shah Shuja and his party arrived at Tripura on 16 May, and in Manipur in December . Aware that Aurangzeb’s scouts and spies were searching for the former Shah, the Tripura officials spread misinformation that Shuja had died at Arakan, or was travelling to Mecca, among other stories. Among other precautionary measures, Shuja was sent by elephant to the hill country of Ukhrul. Mir Jumla II learned of the situation and sent three men to Manipur in late December, to detain and retrieve Shuja's family. However, the Qazi of Manipur, Muhammad Sani, detained the chief emissary of the Mughals, Nur Beg to ensure that the others, Dur Beg and Rustam Beg, did not provide information regarding Shuja’s presence in Manipur.  At that time, Shuja was in hiding at a cave known later as Shuja-lok ("Shuja Cave"), Haignang, Kairang (east of Imphal). According to some accounts he later died at the cave.

The Manipuri Muslims are the descendants of the soldiers from Sylhet and the local Meitei women. The Meitei Kings of Manipur gave their surnames based on their professions. For example, Fundreimayum was the surname given to those who worked on lathe. Likewise, Chesam was given as surname to those who worked in paper industry.

Population
Their present population is 239,886, making up 8.40% of the state of Manipur population as per 2011 census. Pangal mostly settled in the periphery of Manipur near River bank, near lake and foothills. The Pangals are mainly concentrated in and around Imphal, the capital of Manipur and Thoubal. There is large number of pangals live in Cachar in Assam, Hojai in Assam, Komolpur in Tripura and Bangladesh. It is believed that the ancestors of the Meitei Pangals settled in this region are migrated from Manipur during the seven years devastation also known as Chahi-Taret Khuntakpa, the black period in the history of Manipur when Burmese invasions of Assam and their conquest of Manipur around 1815 AD.

Culture 
Meitei Pangals have many family names. They are an indigenous and peace-loving community. Traditional dress for men is Lungis and pajamas, and for women is Kurtis, Shalwar and phanek. Both also wear western attire. They maintained their own identity though they assimilated and intermixed with the other local communities.

Stratification 
Meitei Pangals are divided into many clans or family titles.

The Ayekpam descend from an artist. Ayekpam translates to "the one who paints".
The Baseimayum descend from a kingdom in Sylhet known as Basa (or Pasha). However, R.B. Pemberton suggests this kingdom was in Cachar.
The Makak trace their heritage as the founders of the 12th-century Barmaqam Powa Makkah, renovated by the 15th-century Sultan of Bengal Alauddin Husain Shah. They are divided into three clans:
The Makakyum Ariba clan are descended from a member of the Banu Makhzum tribe in Makkah. 
The Makak Amuba clan are descended from Lukhiyarful, who is a descendant of Nurullah Herati, the Subahdar of Kamrup/Shujabad in 1677 - who comes from Herat, Afghanistan.
The Makak Angouba clan are descended from Sunarful, who is a descendant of Lutfullah Shirazi - a Mughal officer.
The Malsam are descended from an early seventeenth-century man called Malsa who migrated to Manipur from the Brahmaputra Valley.
The Mansam are descended from a seventeenth-century man who migrated to Manipur from the Surma Valley.

Issues

Discrimination 
Despite the Pangals having a long history in the area, sharing many cultural traits with their non-Muslim neighbors, and generally living in peace as a minority; they have recently faced episodes of discrimination, marginalization, and Islamophobia from the Manipur government, some politicians and other Manipuris. Stereotypes of Pangals include that they are anti-social and prone to certain crimes like thievery or drug trading. 

The 1993 Pangal massacre saw the death of around 130 Pangals and the burning of their homes. Mobs killed and assaulted Pangal men and women and destroyed Pangal-owned commercial establishments. The police were criticized for doing little to curtail the violence or stop the misinformation. The rise of the BJP in Manipur since 2016 has led to a rise of attacks against Pangals. Yumnam Devjit, the son of Yumnam Joykumar Singh, wrote in a facebook post that the Qurbani ritual done during Eid al- Adha "was nothing but training for Muslims to kill."

In September 2018, a Pangal entrepreneur named Mohamed Farooq Khan was lynched by a mob and the video of his lynching was soon spread throughout social media. He was lynched for allegedly stealing a scooter but there has been alternative reports that Khan was wrongfully framed for the theft. This incident had led to local Pangals fearing for their safety.

Political marginalization 
According to a report of a journalist named Chingiz Khan of The Pioneer, Meitei Pangals have little political representation in the Manipur government and institutions with very few of them holding political office. The Manipur government initially refused to include a Muslim representative during the drafting of the Protection of Manipur People proposed by the State Government on May 23, 2018. The bill was meant to prevent Rohingyas (and certain other migrants) from settling in Manipur. A narrative that was spread during the creation of the bill was that Pangals gave asylum to the Rohingyas and placed blame on them for the perceived offense.

The Pangals generally receive a disproportionately low amount of aid from the government compared to the Meiteis and other native groups in the area. The implementation of the KGBV program was established among the Naga and Kukis but not in areas with sizable Pangal populations. Access to higher education, healthcare, and employment is considered an obstacle.

According to a piece in Firstpost, Pangals have experienced the loss of some of their land in a more frequent rate after the 1993 Pangal massacre. There was an 2018 incident in where the Manipuri government forced 400 Pangals to leave their residences, alleging that the locals lived in forest reserves and paddy rice areas. The government deployed the police and utilized environmental laws to execute the evictions. The Pangals have not yet been given compensation for these evictions. Advocates have claimed that comparable areas inhabited by Meiteis face much less scrutiny and evictions. Chingiz Khan, writing for Manipur Daily, stated that these actions by the state has encouraged other native groups in the area to threaten Pangals and their businesses to vacate the place.

Notable people 
Amjad Ali, MLA Yairipok Kendra in the 1950s
Ashraf Ali, MLA/Minister of Andro in 1974
Chaoba Pangal, Politician,MLA,1970s, Wankhem Constituency
Mohammed Alimuddin, former Chief Minister of Manipur
Sheikh Noorul Hassan, MLA of Kshetrigao
Nurul Huda, Marxist from Cachar
Muhammed Alauddin Khan, former Manipur minister
Yaima Haji, MLA, Keirao Constituency,1970s
Abdul LatiF, two-time MLA of Mayang Imphal
Kutub Ahmed Mazumder, Congress politician based in Assam
Muhammad Abdul Nasir, MLA of Lilong
Muhammad Fajur Rahim, former MLA of Wabgai
Habibur Rahaman, former MLA of Wabgai
Haji Abdul Salam, 3-time MLA of Wabgai
Amin Shah, former MLA of Kshetrigao

References

Bibliography 

 Irene, Salam (2010). The Muslims of Manipur. Delhi: Kalpaz Publications.

Further reading 

Hui Legends of The Companions of The Prophet, China Heritage,20 Sep 2010, www.chinaheritagenewsletter.org/article.
 For Muslim settlement since 7th century see History Of Migration In the Valley Of Manipur by Dr. Oinam Ranjit Singh.
 Manipuri Muslims: Socially Speaking

External links 
 Muslims in Manipur: A look at their socio-economic condition - TCN News
 How Muslims came to be in Manipur

Meitei Pangals
Muslim communities of India
Ethnic groups in Manipur
Ethnic groups in Bangladesh
Ethnic groups in Pakistan
Ethnic groups in Myanmar
Social groups of Pakistan
Persecution of Muslims
Ethnic groups in South Asia
Ethnic groups in Southeast Asia